Masumabad (also Romanized as Ma‘şūmābād) is a village in Gharbi Rural District, in the Central District of Ardabil County, Ardabil Province, Iran. At the 2006 census, its population was 617, in 125 families.

References 

Towns and villages in Ardabil County